Saint-Pierre-sur-Orthe is a former commune in the Mayenne department in north-western France. On 1 January 2021, it was merged into the new commune Vimartin-sur-Orthe.

See also
Communes of the Mayenne department
Parc naturel régional Normandie-Maine

References

Saintpierresurorthe